Lixy María Rodríguez Zamora (born 4 November 1990) is a Costa Rican footballer who plays as an attacking midfielder for Liga MX Femenil side León and the Costa Rica women's national team.

Honours 
Costa Rica
Winner
 Central American Games: 2013

References

External links
 
 Lixy Rodríguez at Fedefutbol 
 
 
 
 

1990 births
Living people
People from Grecia (canton)
Costa Rican women's footballers
Women's association football midfielders
Santa Teresa CD players
Real Madrid Femenino players
L.D. Alajuelense footballers
Club León (women) footballers
Liga MX Femenil players
Costa Rica women's international footballers
Footballers at the 2011 Pan American Games
Central American Games medalists in football
Central American Games gold medalists for Costa Rica
Competitors at the 2014 Central American and Caribbean Games
Central American and Caribbean Games bronze medalists for Costa Rica
Central American and Caribbean Games medalists in football
2015 FIFA Women's World Cup players
Footballers at the 2015 Pan American Games
Competitors at the 2018 Central American and Caribbean Games
Central American and Caribbean Games silver medalists for Costa Rica
Footballers at the 2019 Pan American Games
Medalists at the 2019 Pan American Games
Pan American Games bronze medalists for Costa Rica
Pan American Games medalists in football
Costa Rican expatriate footballers
Costa Rican expatriate sportspeople in Spain
Expatriate women's footballers in Spain
Costa Rican expatriate sportspeople in Mexico
Expatriate women's footballers in Mexico